Donovan Lentz (born 20 July 1982) is a South African cricketer. He played in two first-class and two List A matches for Border in 2005.

See also
 List of Border representative cricketers

References

External links
 

1982 births
Living people
South African cricketers
Border cricketers
Cricketers from Port Elizabeth